"Bad" (also stylised as "BAD!") is a song by French music producer and DJ David Guetta and Dutch production duo Showtek, featuring vocals from Australian singer Vassy. It was released on 17 March 2014 as a single of the deluxe version from Guetta's studio album, Listen. It was written and produced by Guetta, Showtek, Sultan & Ned Shepard, and Manuel Reuter and it was co-written by Giorgio Tuinfort, Ossama Al Sarraf, Vassy, and Nick Turpin. The song entered and peaked on the UK Singles Chart at number 22. This track has since topped the chart in Finland and Norway. The song, which features vocals from Vassy, features her with an Auto-Tuned voice; reviews were critical of the effects applied to the vocals.

Lyric video
The lyric video is on both David Guetta's YouTube and Vevo account. It is a total of 2 minutes and 50 seconds long. It was released on April 10, 2014.

It starts out with a girl fighting zombies while the zombies dance as a reference to Michael Jackson's "Thriller". Suddenly, she falls in love with one of the zombies who goes up to her, and the two run away from the military, who are chasing them.

Critical reception
Mike Wass of Idolator wrote: "The grittier electro-house sound of 'Bad' is perhaps an indication that the hitmaker is moving away from the commercial dance sound of his last LP. Former hardstyle duo Showtek ensure that the beats come thicker and faster than ever, while Australian dance diva Vassy provides the instantly catchy hook — albeit in a heavily autotuned voice."

Track listing

Charts and certifications

Weekly charts

Year-end charts

Certifications

References 

2014 singles
2014 songs
David Guetta songs
Showtek songs
Songs written by DJ Manian
Songs written by Vassy (singer)
Number-one singles in Norway
Vassy (singer) songs
Song recordings produced by David Guetta
Animated music videos